Dhruvam is a 1993 Indian Malayalam-language action drama film directed by Joshiy, where story and dialogue are by S. N. Swamy and A. K. Sajan and screenplay by S. N. Swamy. It stars Mammootty, Jayaram,  Suresh Gopi, Vikram, Gautami and Tiger Prabhakar. The musical score and songs were composed by S. P. Venkatesh. It was Vikram's debut in Malayalam cinema. The film was a blockbuster at the box office and was dubbed in Tamil as Narasimha Naicker.

Plot
An araachar (hangman) from Tamil Nadu is hired by the prison authorities to hang Hyder Marakkar, a notorious gangster with terrorists links, but is killed in a road accident. DIG Marar smells foul play as the hangmen are either murdered, bribed or threatened. Marar's efforts to bring the hangmen from other states are also in vain as all of them are simply too afraid to hang Hyder, where he goes to Kamakshipuram along with a young police officer named Jose Nariman, to meet Narasimha Mannadiar, a revered village lord and member of the royal family who had once ruled the hamlet, and is worshipped and revered by his villagers. Mannadiar is known for his generous and fearless attitude, and his thirst for justice and peace for his village has made him an enemy in the eyes of politicians and a certain group of cops. While on the search for the state's hangman, Mannadiar and Marar luckily meets the hangman's brother Kasi, who agrees to hang Hyder. Upon Nariman's request, Mannadiar's secretary Ponmani, shares a few stories from Mannadiar's life that made him popular. One among them was shared with his younger brother Veerasimha Mannadiar.

Veeran was in love with Maya and had informed Mannadiar about it. A few days before the marriage, a young man named Bhadran arrives at Mannadiar's house, and tells that he is in love with Maya, and also added that her parents had agreed to the marriage without Maya's consent. Mannadiar called off Veeran's marriage and gets Maya and Bhadran married. Bhadran was a gang member of Marakkar, who did not want to kill the DIG. Hence, Bhadran was a target of the gang. Veeran saves Bhadran and the latter is appointed as Mannadiar's driver. Marakkar kills Marar's son and also kills Veeran as he would have been an eyewitness. From that day onwards, Mannadiar waits for the chance to avenge for his brother's death. Upon hearing the story, Nariman decides to help Mannadiar. Although convicted by court for execution, Marakkar tries every possible way to escape. Mannadiar and Bhadran get themselves taken to the prison where Hyder has been kept. While transferring Hyder to another prison, Mannadiar, along with Bhadran, kidnaps Hyder with Nariman's assistance. Hyder challenges Mannadiar to a fair fight, where he initially overpowers Mannadiar, who soon gets the better of him. In order to save Mannadiar from a bomb thrown by Hyder's associates, Nariman catches the bomb and falls on it, which explodes, killing him. Mannadiar hangs Hyder from a tree. At the court, Mannadiar takes the full responsibility for the murders thereby making Bhadran a pardoned-witness and Mannadiar receives death sentence from the court.

Cast

Mammootty as Narasimha Mannadiar
Jayaram as Veerasimha Mannadiar
Suresh Gopi as SI Jose Nariman
Vikram as Bhadran
Gautami as Mythili, Mannadiar's wife
Tiger Prabhakar as Hyder Marakkar
Rudra as Maya 
Shammi Thilakan as Ali, Marakkar's Brother
Santhosh as Hassan, Marakkar's Brother
Janardhanan as D. I. G. Marar
T. G. Ravi as Kasi, new hangman
Vijayaraghavan as SP Ramdas
K. P. A. C. Azeez as Nambiar
Babu Namboothiri as Ponmani
M. S. Thripunithura as Kunjikkannan, Maya's Father
P. K. Abraham as Chidambaram, Mythili's father
Delhi Ganesh as Ramayyan
Appa Haja as Prathapan, Marar's Son
Kollam Thulasi as MLA Chekutty
Subair as doctor
Ravi Vallathol as Circle Inspector
Aliyar as doctor

Release
The film was released on 27 January 1993.

Box office
The film was a blockbuster at the boxoffice.

Music
The songs and background score were composed by S. P. Venkatesh.

References

External links
 
 Dhruvam - Movie Reviews, Videos, Wallpapers, Photos, Cast & Crew, Story & Synopsis on popcorn.oneindia.in

1990s Malayalam-language films
1990s action films
1993 films
Indian action thriller films
Indian gangster films
Films about terrorism in India
Fictional portrayals of the Kerala Police
Films directed by Joshiy